Benjamin Bowles Hampton (1875–1932) was an American film producer, writer, and director. He led a 1916 plan to conglomerate film companies via acquisition. He was married to actress Claire Adams and was a partner in Zane Grey Pictures. He wrote the History of the American Film Industry from Its Beginnings to 1931. He is credited with producing numerous films.

Hampton published a couple of stories in Hampton's Broadway Magazine. He held copyrights on Hampton's Magazine and Hampton's Broadway Magazine. He accepted Jack London's story Mauki after it was turned down by other publications and remained committed to publishing stories of social injustices even after other publications had moved on believing readership had lost interest in that type of anti-Capitalist tale.

In his book on the history of the film industry to 1932, Hampton emphasized the industry's widespread mass market appeal in the U.S.

Hampton wrote in his film history about the success of an early fight film in 1897 and the criticism of it and "Living Pictures" generally by William Randolph Hearst as Yellow Journalism.

Selected filmography

Producer
The Westerners (1919)
 Desert Gold (1919)
 Riders of the Dawn (1920)
 The Money Changers (1920)
The Dwelling Place of Light (1920)
 A Certain Rich Man (1921)
 The Man of the Forest (1921)
 The Mysterious Rider (1921)
The Gray Dawn (1922)
Golden Dreams (1922), an adaptation of a Zane Grey novel
 Heart's Haven (1922)

References

American male screenwriters
American film directors
1875 births
1932 deaths
American film producers
20th-century American male writers
20th-century American screenwriters